Theodora Maria "Thea" van Rijnsoever (born 27 November 1956 in Ruwiel) is a Dutch cyclist. She competed in the women's road race at the 1984 Summer Olympics, finishing 39th.

See also
 List of Dutch Olympic cyclists

References

1956 births
Living people
Dutch female cyclists
Olympic cyclists of the Netherlands
Cyclists at the 1984 Summer Olympics
People from Breukelen
Cyclists from Utrecht (province)